Doctor Dolittle's Puddleby Adventures is a collection of short stories written and illustrated by Hugh Lofting, published posthumously as twelfth and last in the Doctor Dolittle series of children's fiction. The stories and illustrations were distributed during the 1920s by the Herald Tribune Syndicate and all may been published in the New York Herald Tribune newspaper, among others. The 1952 collection was their first appearance in book form.

The first edition contained introductory items by his widow and sister-in-law and eight Doctor Dolittle stories by Hugh Lofting:
 "Foreword" by Josephine Lofting
 "Doctor Dolittle and His Family" by Olga Fricker
 "The Sea Dog" (†)
 "Dapple"
 "The Dog Ambulance"
 "The Stunned Man"
 "The Crested Screamers"
 "The Green Breasted Martins"
 "The Story of the Maggot" (†)
 "The Lost Boy"
The contemporary book club edition omitted two of the longer stories (†) and there have been later editions of six rather than eight stories, without explanation. Separately, some editions omit the Foreword. In the Foreword, Lofting's widow Josephine Fricker Lofting named her collaborator "my sister, Olga Michael", as she had done in the Foreword to its predecessor, the novel Doctor Dolittle and the Green Canary (1950), which Olga Fricker Michael completed after Hugh Lofting's death.

The first four stories may be read at the beginning of the 1927 novel Doctor Dolittle's Garden. "The Green Breasted Martins" follows Chapter XII in The Story of Doctor Dolittle (1920). "The Crested Screamers" and "The Lost Boy" are to be placed in that order within Part One, Chapter 12 of the 1926 book Doctor Dolittle's Caravan. "The Story of the Maggot" is given a greatly reduced summary at the conclusion to early printings of Part Two, Chapter 4 of Doctor Dolittle's Garden.

External links 
 
 Puddleby Adventures at Open Library – 1971 and 1981 publications (catalogued as 1966 Cape and 1969 Penguin) may be previewed or borrowed

1952 children's books
1952 short story collections
Fantasy short story collections
Children's short story collections
Doctor Dolittle books
Books published posthumously
J. B. Lippincott & Co. books